Al-Rayyan Sports Club is a Qatari multi-sports club fielding teams in a number of sports such as football, futsal, basketball, volleyball, handball, athletics, table tennis, and swimming. It is based at the Ahmed bin Ali Stadium in Umm Al Afaei in the city of Al Rayyan. The club was founded in 1967 after merging the old Rayyan team with Nusoor Club. The official team colours are red and black.

They have won numerous titles in all sports, including two Asian championships in basketball, the Arab championship in handball, futsal domestic titles, table tennis, and volleyball, as well as numerous GCC basketball, handball, and volleyball championships. Both the basketball and handball teams have qualified for the world championships. However, the football team gets the most attention from the club officials, media, and fans.

History

1967–1973: Founding
Al Rayyan's history goes back to the mid-1960s when it was known as Old Al Rayyan. Old Al Rayyan, though an amateur football team, competed in matches arranged throughout the whole country, not being limited to the city in which it was based. Their headquarters was in a two-bedroom house, and they played their matches on a football field in a school based in the New Rayyan area. The club relied on donations from the fans during this period.

In 1967, Al Rayyan began as a combination of two groups called " new Al Rayyan’sons and old al-Rayyan’son". In 1967, Al-Rayyan started its factory. From 1967 until now, Al-Rayyan has won many trophies not only in soccer even in the rest of the games such as handball, basketball and volleyball. The people who contributed to build Al Rayyan knew that this team would not be a regular team, but it will also represent the culture of the city of Al Rayyan outside of Qatar. In 2008, the club established magazine called SOUT AL RAYYAN (The Voice of Al Rayyan) which is the first magazine that cares about Al Rayyan news, and it is the only team's magazine in Qatar.

They applied to be a member club of the Qatar Football Association, but were rejected with the QFA proposing that they merge with Al Nusoor, a local sports club also based in Al Rayyan. In 1967, after an announcement by the Al Rayyan Sports Committee that Old Al Rayyan would merge with Al Nusoor, Al Rayyan SC was officially founded. A new headquarters was established to accommodate increased size demands as a result of the merger. The first head coach of Al Rayyan was Ashour Salem, a Sudanese national, who, besides working as a local physical education coach, trained the first team and youth team. In the early years, the club branched out to other sports, notably basketball and handball. As a result of donations from the club supporters, Al Rayyan was able to establish their home grounds in Doha Stadium, the largest stadium in Qatar at that time.

1973–1988: Early history
The club had success in the Qatar Stars League within the first decade of its formation, with the club participating in their first official season in 1972–73. In the 1974–75, after a mass brawl between the fans and players of Al Rayyan and Al Sadd, the QFA relegated Al Rayyan, who were in 2nd place at the time, to the second division. They won back promotion the following season and achieved their first league title 1976. In the 1977 season, the QFA annulled the results of Al Rayyan due to actions which took place in a match against Al Arabi. The perpetrator, who was an Al Arabi player by the name of Yassin Mustafa, was banned permanently from all league matches whereas the two clubs were warned.

In 1983, under the leadership of Mohammed Bin Hammam Al Abdulla, a new club headquarters and home stadium were constructed. They won the league with a negative goal difference in 1983–84, making them one of the only 6 teams in the world and the only Qatari team in history to achieve this feat.

1988–2000: Relegation and return to glory
In the 1987–88 season, much to the surprise of critics and fans, they got relegated for the first time in league history. The relegation was preceded by a 0–1 loss to Al Sadd, as Hassan Jowhar scored a header goal which would prove to be the final nail in the coffin of Al Rayyan. They won back promotion to the premier league in their first season in the second division. 

They would go on to win the league in 1990, the same season they were promoted back to the first division, beating out rivals Al Sadd. They won an additional league title in 1995.

2000–2013: League title drought
They inaugurated their home ground, Ahmed bin Ali Stadium, in 2003 during the reign of Sheikh Mishaal Al Thani. The first match held on the grounds was the 2003 Emir Cup finals. 

The club has not experienced much league success as of late, with the last successful league campaign being in 1994–95; however they finished third in the 2010–11 season under Paulo Autuori. Nonetheless, they faced great success in the Emir's Cup and Heir Apparent Cup winning eight cups in total in 14 years.

2014–: Return to success
In 2014–15 the club won the Qatargas League and returned to Qatar Stars League. On 28 November 2015, Al-Rayyan Broke the record of most consecutive league matches won to 11. 

On 5 March 2016, after 21 years Al-Rayyan won the league once again, and became the first ever team to win both leagues in two years.

Supporters

Al-Rayyan one of the most popular clubs in Qatar and supported throughout the entire Gulf region, as well as other parts of the world due to their high-profile signings. In 2010, they had the highest attendance in the Qatar Stars League. The fan club won the QFA-sanctioned award of "best fans" in the 2008/09 season, and shared the award with Al Sadd in the 2012/13 season.

Rivalries

Al Arabi

Head-to-head
Since 1994 Updated 16 March 2023

Al Sadd

Head-to-head
Since 1995 Updated 16 March 2023

Al Gharafa

Head-to-head
Since 1995 Updated 16 March 2023

Al Duhail

Head-to-head
Updated 16 March 2023

Honours

Qatar Stars League
Champions (8): 1975–76, 1977–78, 1981–82, 1983–84, 1985–86, 1989–90, 1994–95, 2015–16

Emir of Qatar Cup
Champions (6): 1998–99, 2003–04, 2005–06, 2010, 2011, 2013

Qatar Crown Prince Cup
Champions (4): 1995, 1996, 2001, 2012

Qatar Super Cup/Shiekh Jassem Cup
Champions (5): 1992, 2000, 2012, 2013, 2018

Continental record

Key: PO – Play-off round; 1R/2R – First/Second round; R16 – Round of 16; QF – Quarter-final; SF – Semi-final;

Notes

Asian competitions goals
Statistics correct as  March 7, 2023

Stadium

Ahmed bin Ali Stadium, popularly known as the Al-Rayyan Stadium, is a multi-purpose stadium in Al-Rayyan, Qatar which serves as the home stadium for Al Rayyan's football section. It will be used as a venue for the 2022 FIFA World Cup.

Players
As of Qatar Stars League:

Out on loan

Technical staff
Last update: February 2022.

First team

Notable players

This list includes players whom have made significant contributions to their national team and to the club. At least 90 caps for the club or 100 caps for their national team is needed to be considered for inclusion.

Managerial history 

Present and past managers of Al-Rayyan from 1967 (incomplete):

 Salem Ashour (1967–??), (1973–??)1
 Saleh Youssef (ca. 1976)2
 Powell (1976–??)3
 Abdul Moneim Al Haj (1981–83)
 Eid Mubarak (1984)
 Vavá (1984–85)
 Wayne Jones (1985)
 Eid Mubarak (1985)
 Colin Dobson (1985–87)
 Vavá (ca. 1989)
 Alan Dicks (1989–90)
 Abdul Moneim Al Haj (1990)
 René Simões (1 July 1990–91)
 Luis Alberto (1991–92)
 René Simões (1992 – 30 June 1993)
 Cabralzinho (1993–94)
 Jørgen E. Larsen (1 July 1994 – 30 June 1995)
 Evaristo de Macedo (1995)
 Benny Johansen (1 July 1995–96)
 Eid Mubarak (1996–97)
 Antoni Piechniczek (1997)
 Zdzisław Podedworny (1997–98)
 Allan Jones (1998)
 Roald Poulsen (1998–99)
 Jørgen E. Larsen (1 July 1999 – 30 June 2000)
 Dutra (2000)
 Paulo Campos (2000)
 Santos (2000–01)
 Paulo Henrique (2001–02)
 Amarildo (2002)
 Jean Castaneda (2002–04)
 Bosse Nilsson (2004)
 Jørgen E. Larsen (1 July 2004 – 30 June 2005)
 Ron van den Berg (2005)
 Luis Fernández (26 June 2005 – 15 Nov 2005)
 Hassan Hormatallah (Nov 2005–05)
 Ladislas Lozano (2005–06)
 Rabah Madjer (2006 – 30 June 2006)
 Pierre Lechantre (2006–07)
 Paulo Autuori (2 May 2007 – 17 May 2009)
 Marcos Paquetá (1 July 2009 – 30 June 2010)
 Paulo Autuori (21 Nov 2009 – 30 June 2011)
 Diego Aguirre (Sept 6, 2011 – 3 Nov 2013)
 Rastko Stojkovic (2013)
 Manuel Jiménez (4 Nov 2013 – 20 May 2015)
 Jorge Fossati (20 May 2015 – 3 October 2016)
 Michael Laudrup (26 September 2016 – 30 June 2018)
 Rodolfo Arruabarrena (5 July 2018 – 8 October 2018)
 Bülent Uygun (10 October 2018 – 5 March 2019 )
 Gilson (6 March 2019 – 30 June 2019)
 Diego Aguirre (28 May 2019 – 11 December 2020)
 Fábio César (10 December 2020 – 18 December 2020)
 Laurent Blanc (19 December 2020 – 13 February 2022)
 Nicolás Córdova (13 February 2022 – Present)

Administrative managers
 Ashraf Mehdi (1984–85)
 Saad Abu El Dahab (1985–)

Notes
1. Non-professional coach; worked as local physical education teacher.
2. First professional coach.
3. First non-Arab coach.

Al-Rayyan in Asia

They participated in the AFC Champions League in 2005, 2007, 2011, 2012,2013.,2014,2017,2018,2019,2020,2021 & 2022.

References

External links
 Official website 
 Al Rayyan Club at QFA

 
Rayyan
Association football clubs established in 1967
Multi-sport clubs in Qatar
Sport in Al Rayyan
1967 establishments in Qatar